Bakht Buland Shah was a ruler of the Rajgond dynasty. He added to his kingdom, the territories of Chanda and Mandla, and portions of Nagpur, Balaghat, Seoni, Bhandara and the adjoining Rajput kingdom of Kherla/Khedla. The present districts of Chhindwara and Betul also fell under his control. A great warrior, he went on to conquer Pauni, Dongartal, Sivni & Katangi.

Ascension to the throne
Bakht Buland's initial name was Bhagtu. After his father Kok Shah's death, a war of succession broke out. He was the younger son of Gorakh Shah, the Gond ruler of Deogarh. To save his throne from his brother, Bakht Buland went to Delhi in 1686 and reluctantly accepted Islam to get military assistance from the emperor Aurangzeb against his brother but with an understanding that he would dine with Muslims but continue to accept brides from the Gonds. As a result, his descendants continued to have marital relations with the Rajgonds and performed marriages according to Hindu rites followed by those of the Islamic religion. In exchange, he was recognized as the Raja of Deogarh. With Aurangzeb's help, he was firmly established as the ruler of Deogarh in 1668.

Reign
Bakht Buland Shah later rebelled against the Mughals in 1700 and snatch portions of their territory, when the empire had grown weak due to the long Mughal war against the Marathas. He even plundered the Mughal territory on both sides of the Wardha. Thus Deogarh, for a brief period, stood as a semi-independent or practically independent kingdom. Thus he earned the disfavour of Aurangzeb. Aurangzeb thereupon ordered that the title Bakht Buland meaning ‘of high fortune’ should be changed to Nigun Bakht-of mean fortune. Nothing is known of the army sent to punish Bakht.

He was ceded the district of Seoni, Chauri, Dongartal and Ghansour by Narendra Shah of Mandla for his aid against the latter's cousins. He also added large parts of the Chanda Kingdom to his domain. His kingdom included the present day districts of Chhindwara, Betul, Balaghat, Sivni (Seoni) and Bhandara.

History idolizes him as the founder of the Nagpur city. Bakht Buland Shah founded the city of Nagpur in 1702/1703 (according to different sources) by joining the twelve small villages formerly known as Rajapur Barsa or Barasta. He built roads and a strong wall around the city.

In 1702 Many towns and villages were founded. All the smaller villages were merged. According to Sir Richard Jenkins- "He indiscriminately employed Musalmans and Hindus of ability to introduce order and regularity into his immediate domain. Industrious settlers from all quarters were attracted to Gondwana, thousands of villages were founded, and agriculture, manufacture and even commerce made considerable advances. It may be said that much of the success of the Maratha administration was owing to the groundwork established by him."

After giving a proper shape to his kingdom, he encouraged people to settle and thus facilitated trade & Commerce. His rule epitomizes an era of great reforms. Agriculture, trade, and commerce made considerable advances. He constructed a Mosque in the Fort of Nagpur which initiated the Islamic religion & culture in Nagpur. He died in about 1706 and was succeeded by his elder son Chand Sultan.

References

History of India
History of Nagpur
History of Maharashtra
Maharajas of Nagpur